Traumatic purpura is a skin condition resulting from trauma which produces ecchymoses of bizarre shapes suggestive of abuse.

See also 
 Obstructive purpura
 Skin lesion

References 

Vascular-related cutaneous conditions